Cleonymia korbi is a moth of the family Noctuidae. It is found in south-eastern Spain.

Taxonomy
The species was long treated as a synonym of Cleonymia yvanii, but was reinstated as a valid species in 2010.

References

Moths described in 1895
Cuculliinae